Nicholas Kralev (born 1974) is an American author, journalist, analyst, speaker and entrepreneur specializing in international affairs and global travel. He has been particularly recognized for his work on American diplomacy and the U.S. Foreign Service.

He is currently the executive director of the Washington International Diplomatic Academy, an independent executive education center for diplomats, other government officials, and business leaders.

Previously, he led Kralev International LLC, a consulting and training firm in the fields of international affairs, communications, and global travel. He also served as host and executive producer of the TV series on diplomacy "Conversations with Nicholas Kralev." He often speaks at conferences and other events around the world. His work has taken him to almost 100 countries.

From 2001 until 2010, he was a diplomatic correspondent for the Washington Times and accompanied three United States Secretary of States (Hillary Clinton, Condoleezza Rice and Colin Powell) on foreign travel. He also wrote the weekly business travel column "On the Fly."

Prior to that, he was a special correspondent for the weekend edition of the Financial Times. Among his interviewees were Madeleine Albright, Denzel Washington, Sharon Stone, John Malkovich, Kevin Costner, Larry King, and Walter Cronkite.

He is the author of America's Other Army: The U.S. Foreign Service and 21st-Century Diplomacy and Decoding Air Travel: A Guide to Saving on Airfare and Flying in Luxury. He is a contributor to The Atlantic, Foreign Policy magazine, and The Huffington Post, and has appeared on NPR, CNN, BBC, PBS, Fox News, C-SPAN, and other U.S. and foreign stations.

He holds a master's degree in public policy from Harvard University's John F. Kennedy School of Government

References

Living people
1974 births
Male journalists
21st-century travel writers
American travel writers
Writers from Washington, D.C.
University of Bridgeport alumni
Harvard Kennedy School alumni
American political journalists